The fourteenth series of the Australian cooking game show MasterChef Australia premiered on 18 April 2022 on Network 10. The format for this season is Fans & Favourites, and features 12 new contestants and 12 former contestants. Andy Allen, Melissa Leong, and Jock Zonfrillo returned to the show as judges from the previous season.

In October 2021, Ten announced that MasterChef Australia would return for its 14th season in 2022, initially announced as Foodies Vs. Favourites. In January 2022, production was temporarily halted after several members of the cast and production team contracted the COVID-19 virus. The judges, cast and crew are all fully vaccinated against the virus.

This series was won by Billie McKay in the grand finale against Sarah Todd, on 12 July 2022, making her the first and only two-time MasterChef Australia champion.

Changes

This season omitted the broadcast of the audition stage for the new contestants and started with the 24 contestants competing in an Immunity Pin Challenge. Like the previous season, the holders of an Immunity Pin were able to use them at any point during future Elimination Challenges. The series featured more Immunity Pins handed out than any previous series, with seven being handed out in total. Christina, Harry, Tommy, Billie, Michael, Sarah and Julie were the winners of the seven pins at various points during the season.

In this season, the typical MasterChef weekly format was slightly changed. Mondays now feature a Mystery Box with the bottom entries facing Tuesday's Pressure Test elimination. Wednesdays feature a Team Challenge with the winning team competing in the Immunity Challenge on Thursday, in which one contestant will be granted immunity from the upcoming elimination. All the other contestants then head into the All-In Elimination Challenge on Sunday.

Initially, instead of randomly chosen teams most team challenges at the beginning of the season featured contestants competing as members of either the Fans (new contestants) or Favourites (returning contestants) teams. This continued until week 6 when the two teams were dissolved.

Like season 12, this season did not feature a "second chance" challenge for eliminated contestants to return to the show.

Contestants
The 12 returning contestants were announced in a sneak peek on 23 March 2022. The full cast was announced on 3 April 2022.

Guests

Elimination chart

Episodes and ratings
 Colour key:
  – Highest rating during the series
  – Lowest rating during the series

References

MasterChef Australia
2022 Australian television seasons
Television series impacted by the COVID-19 pandemic